Best of Vegas is a 2011 live album by American singer Frank Sinatra that contains 17 live tracks from the 2006 box set, Sinatra: Vegas.

In the span of a few years, Las Vegas refueled Sinatra's career and Sinatra in turn became the lead figure in the city's ascendance. It was a synergistic relationship that has since become legendary in the annals of 20th century entertainment.

The collection includes live performances of pop standards such as "The Lady Is a Tramp", "I've Got You Under My Skin", "All or Nothing at All", "Pennies from Heaven" and the "Theme From New York, New York".

Track listing
Introduction  - 0:26
"The One I Love (Belongs to Somebody Else)" (Isham Jones, Gus Kahn)  – 2:39
"Moonlight in Vermont" (John Blackburn, Karl Suessdorf)  – 3:07
"The Lady Is a Tramp" (Richard Rodgers, Lorenz Hart)  – 3:40
"I've Got You Under My Skin" (Cole Porter)  – 3:27
"Street of Dreams" (Sam M. Lewis, Victor Young)  – 2:13
"Fly Me to the Moon (In Other Words)" (Bart Howard)  – 2:49
Monologue  – 8:33
"Luck Be a Lady" (Frank Loesser)  – 4:34
"I Can't Get Started" (Vernon Duke, Ira Gershwin)  – 3:05
"Without a Song" (Edward Eliscu, Billy Rose, Vincent Youmans)  – 3:48
"All or Nothing at All" (Arthur Altman, Jack Lawrence)  – 3:21
"Witchcraft" (Cy Coleman, Carolyn Leigh)  – 2:43
"Pennies from Heaven" (Johnny Burke, Arthur Johnston)  – 3:41
"Angel Eyes" (Earl Brent, Matt Dennis)  – 7:45
"Theme from New York, New York" (Fred Ebb, John Kander)  – 4:40
Bows  – 0:55

 Tracks 1-4 from the Sands Hotel, November 2, 1961
 Tracks 5-9 from the Sands Hotel, January–February 1966
 Tracks 10-12, 16-17 from Caesar's Palace, March 1982
 Tracks 13-15 from the Golden Nugget, April 1987

Track listing
 Frank Sinatra - Vocals
 Bill Miller - Conductor, Piano
 Quincy Jones - Conductor, Arranger
 Antonio Morrelli - Conductor
 Vincent Falcone Jr. - Conductor, Piano
 Count Basie - Piano
 Lou Levy - Piano
 Tony Mottola - Guitar
 Al Viola - Guitar

References

2011 live albums
Frank Sinatra live albums
Live albums recorded in the Las Vegas Valley
Live albums published posthumously